Jack Gilroy Dearlove (5 June 1911 – 11 July 1967) was an English rower who competed for Great Britain in the 1948 Summer Olympics.

Early life
Educated at Lynton House school in Holland Park, West London, he suffered severe injuries in a road accident aged 13 which resulted in his right leg being amputated.

Sporting career
At the 1948 Summer Olympics in England he was the coxswain of the British boat which won the silver medal in the Eights, and at the 1950 Empire Games in New Zealand he won the bronze medal as cox of the English boat in the Eights competition.

Personal life
His son Richard Dearlove went into the British Civil Service, becoming the British Government's Chief of the Secret Intelligence Service, and later Master of Pembroke College, Cambridge.

References

External links
 Jack Dearlove's profile at Sports Reference.com
 Jack Dearlove's obituary

1911 births
1967 deaths
English male rowers
Coxswains (rowing)
Olympic rowers of Great Britain
Rowers at the 1948 Summer Olympics
Olympic silver medallists for Great Britain
Rowers at the 1950 British Empire Games
Commonwealth Games bronze medallists for England
Olympic medalists in rowing
English Olympic medallists
Medalists at the 1948 Summer Olympics
Commonwealth Games medallists in rowing
Medallists at the 1950 British Empire Games